The Brunnenbach is a  long, right-hand tributary of the Warme Bode, which flows to the west and south of Braunlage in Goslar district in the north German state of Lower Saxony.

Course 
Shortly after its source the Brunnenbach is impounded by the Silberteich reservoir, before it continues in a southeasterly direction past the Mutter-Kind-Heim Waldmühle, a mother-and-child centre, and local campsite. The Brunnenbach is one of the most important tributaries of the Warme Bode.

Tributaries 
 Fußstiegbach (left)
 Großer Kronenbach (right)
 Schächerbach (right)
 Blechhüttenbach (left)

References

See also 
 List of rivers of Lower Saxony

Rivers of Lower Saxony
Rivers of the Harz
Goslar (district)
Rivers of Germany